= Bell-Pat railway station =

Railway station in Pakistan

Bell-Pat railway station Bukhtiarabad Domki

General information
- Coordinates: 28.99217°N 68.00889°E
- Owner: Ministry of Railways

Other information
- Station code: BPT

History
- Former names: Great Indian Peninsula Railway
Location
- Location within Balochistan, Pakistan Location within Pakistan

Bell-Pat railway station "' بختیارآباد ڈومکی"' (Urdu: بیل پٹ ریلوے اسٹیشن) is located in Pakistan.

== See also ==
- List of railway stations in Pakistan
- Pakistan Railways
